Neta Doris Neale  (née Billcliff; 17 March 1904 – 26 May 1988) was a New Zealand theatre director and speech and drama teacher.

In 1942, Neale formed the Canterbury Housewives' Union with support from feminist activist May Furey.

In the 1976 New Year Honours, Neale was appointed a Member of the Order of the British Empire, for services to the Canterbury Children's Theatre.

References

1904 births
1988 deaths
New Zealand theatre directors
People from Christchurch
New Zealand educators
New Zealand Members of the Order of the British Empire